The Baozhu Bridge, formerly known as Huozhu Bridge, is a historic stone arch bridge in Yuecheng District, Shaoxing, Zhejiang, China.

History
Originally built in the Song dynasty (960–1279), the current bridge was rebuilt in 1749 during the ruling of Qianlong Emperor of the Qing dynasty (1644–1911). There are seven stone steles on the bridge, of which the largest stone stele in the middle is carved with peach reliefs, and the other six on both sides are carved with Chinese dragon reliefs.

In August 2002, it has been inscribed as a municipal cultural relic preservation organ by the Government of Shaoxing.

References

Bridges in Zhejiang
Arch bridges in China
Bridges completed in 1749
Qing dynasty architecture
Buildings and structures completed in 1749
1749 establishments in China